The Dog (狗) is eleventh of the 12-year cycle of animals which appear in the Chinese zodiac related to the Chinese calendar. The Year of the Dog is associated with the Earthly Branch symbol 戌. The character 狗, also refers to the actual animal while 戌, also refers to the zodiac animal.

Years and the Five Elements 
People born within these date ranges can be said to have been born in the "Year of the Dog", while also bearing the following elemental sign:

Basic astrology elements

2018
In the sexagenary cycle, 2018 (16 February 2018–4 February 2019, and every 60-year multiple before and after), is the Celestial stem/Earthly Branch year indicated by the characters 戊戌. For the 2018 Year of the Dog, many countries and regions issued lunar new year stamps. These included countries where the holiday is traditionally observed as well as countries in the Americas, Africa, Europe and Oceania. The  U.S.-China Institute at  USC created a web collection of more than 100 of these stamps.

See also
Dog
Dog in Chinese mythology
Animal worship

References

Further reading

External links

Chinese astrological signs
Vietnamese astrological signs
Mythological dogs
Dogs in religion

de:Chinesische Astrologie#Zählung ab Jahresbeginn